Jacques Lacoursière,  (4 May 1932 – 1 June 2021) was a Canadian TV host, author and historian.

Life and career
Lacoursière was born in Shawinigan, in the Mauricie region, and then resided in Beauport in the Greater Quebec area.

Lacoursière held an M.A. degree in history from the University of Ottawa.

Renowned not only for his talents as a researcher, but also for his ability to communicate and make history accessible to a larger audience, he worked with film director Gilles Carle.  Together they produced the TV series Épopée en Amérique : une histoire populaire du Québec which Lacoursière hosted in 1997.

He died on 1 June 2021, at the age of 89.

Honors
Lacoursière was made a Member of the Order of Canada in 2006. In 2002, he was made a Knight of the National Order of Quebec.

Published books
Over the years Lacoursière has written many books, including:
 1968: Histoire, 1534-1968 (published by Boréal Express under the supervision of Denis Vaugeois and Jacques Lacoursière)
 1969: Les Troubles de 1837-38 with Denis Vaugeois
 1970: L'Acte de Québec et la Révolution américaine with Denis Vaugeois
 1972: Notre histoire: Québec-Canada with Denis Vaugeois
 1972: Alarme citoyens!: l'affaire Cross-Laporte, du connu à l'inconnu. Montréal, Québec, Canada: Editions La Presse, 1972. 438 p.
 1974: Québec 72-73
 1976: Canada-Québec : synthèse historique with Denis Vaugeois
 1979: Il était une fois... le Québec under the supervision of Jacques Lacoursière
 1991: Les Mémoires québécoises (Jacques Mathieu, Jacques Lacoursière) with Jacques Mathieu
 1995 - 1997 : Histoire populaire du Québec
 1997: Monsieur le président : les orateurs et les présidents depuis 1792
 2000: La chanson comme miroir de poche : conversation avec Jacques Lacoursière / Gilles Vigneault with Gilles Vigneault
 2000: Canada-Québec : synthèse historique, 1534-2000 (Nouvelle édition) with Jean Provencher and Denis Vaugeois
 2002: Une histoire du Québec / racontée par Jacques Lacoursière
 2005: L'Île-des-Sœurs : d'hier à aujourd'hui, Les éditions de l'homme, Montréal

Footnotes

1932 births
2021 deaths
French Quebecers
20th-century Canadian historians
Canadian male non-fiction writers
Canadian writers in French
Knights of the National Order of Quebec
Members of the Order of Canada
People from Shawinigan
Academics in Quebec
Historians from Quebec
Writers from Quebec
University of Ottawa alumni
21st-century Canadian historians